Nanna Nenu Naa Boyfriends (English: Father, Me and my boyfriends) is a 2016 Indian Telugu romantic comedy film directed by debutant Bhaskar Bandi and cinematography by Chota K. Naidu. Starring Hebah Patel, Tejaswi Madivada, Rao Ramesh, Parvateesam, Noel Sean and Ashwin Babu is the lead roles. Music by Sekhar Chandra. Screenplay and Dialogues by Prasanna Kumar Bezawada. Produced by Bekkam Venugopal under the banner Lucky Media Pvt Ltd and Distributed by Dil Raju under the banner Sri Venkateswara Creations. Art direction by Vithal kosanam. Choreography by Vijay Prakash. Stunts by Venkat. Lyrics by Chandrabose, Bhaskar Batala, Varrikupala Yadagiri, Kasarala Shyam. The film was released on 16 Dec 2016.

Plot
The story is about Padmavati, a pampered girl who loves her father very much. But her father Raghava Rao is said by a prophesier that his daughter will leave him if he disagree to any of her wish. So Raghava Rao pampers her from her childhood. When she is grown up, her father makes her alliance fixed with a man, who jobs in America. Paddu declares that she will herself choose a guy to marry and if she fails in that, she will marry the guy chosen by her father.

She leaves to Hyderabad and stays with her friend Maggie. Paddu meets Namo, Nani and Gokul. She befriends the three at a time which irritates Maggie. She too proposes all of them when they propose her. Then Paddu decides to test them. Paddu with Maggie tests her boyfriends in which they pass. On Paddu's birthday, her boyfriends wish her and she escapes the hurdles again. Namo, Nani and Gokul get job offers. But Paddu asks them to sacrifice their job or leave her. They sacrifice their career for her. Then Paddu's mother overhears her friend and hers conversation and forces Paddu to leave the city.

Paddu gets saddened by this and her father watches her. He reveals to her he knew about her boyfriends earlier. He meets her boyfriends and tells that Paddu loved three of them at once. They tell him that they have sacrificed their job for her. Raghava Rao then reveals that he had given them jobs to make Paddu decide her bridegroom. He tells that if they do not come to her marriage, he will cancel it. They reach Paddu's village and meet Raju, Paddu's fiancé who saved her at her childhood. Paddu and Raju marry and live happily.

Cast

Hebah Patel as Padmavati / Paddu
Rao Ramesh as Raghava Rao (Padmavati's father)
Parvateesam as Namo
Ashwin Babu as Nani
Noel Sean as Gokul
Tejaswi Madivada  as Maggie, Paddu's friend
Sana as Paddu's mother
Krishna Bhagavan as Station Master
Thotapalli Madhu
Dhanraj
Chammak Chandra as servant's lover
 Shakalaka Shankar as thief
Jabardasth RP
 Jabardasth Ram Prasad
Raj Tarun as Raju, Paddu's fiancé (cameo appearance)

Soundtrack

The film's soundtrack was released on 7 December 2016. The soundtrack has 4 songs. The music is composed by Sekhar Chandra

References

External links

2016 films
2010s Telugu-language films
Indian romantic comedy films
2016 directorial debut films
2016 romantic comedy films